In French cuisine, galantine is a dish of boned stuffed meat, most commonly poultry or fish, that is usually poached and served cold, often coated with aspic. Galantines are often stuffed with forcemeat, and pressed into a cylindrical shape. Since boning poultry can be difficult and time-consuming for the novice, this is a rather elaborate dish, which is often lavishly decorated, hence its name, connoting a presentation at table that is galant, or urbane and sophisticated. In the later nineteenth century the technique's origin was already attributed to the chef of the marquis de Brancas.

In the Middle Ages, the term galauntine or galantyne, perhaps with the same connotations of gallantry, referred instead to any of several sauces made from powdered galangal root, usually made from bread crumbs with other ingredients, such as powdered cinnamon, strained and seasoned with salt and pepper. The dish was sometimes boiled or simmered before or after straining, and sometimes left uncooked, depending on the recipe. Surviving recipes indicate that the sauce may have complemented fish, eels, geese, and venison.  Galantine also appears in Geoffrey Chaucer's "To Rosamond", parodying extravagant declarations of courtly love: 

During the Siege of Leningrad in 1941–1942, the authorities created galantine from 2,000 tons of mutton guts that had been found in the seaport, and later, calfskin, to feed the starving residents of Leningrad.

See also
 Ballotine
 Head cheese
 List of stuffed dishes
 Terrine
 Turducken

References

External links
Peter Hertzmann on galantine

Garde manger
Charcuterie
Stuffed dishes
French chicken dishes